Wallan , traditionally known as Wallan Wallan (large circular place of water), is a town in Victoria,  north of Melbourne's Central Business District. The town sits at the southern end of the large and diverse Shire of Mitchell which extends from the northern fringes of Melbourne into the farming country of north-central Victoria and the lower Goulburn Valley. The township flanks the Hume Freeway and is set against the backdrop of the Great Dividing Range.

Overview 
The fastest growing town and now second largest town in the shire, Wallan is a link between the city and rural towns such as Kilmore, Broadford and Seymour. 15 kilometres to the north is a turnoff to Strath Creek which leads through the Valley of a Thousand Hills.

History
A Wallan Wallan Post Office opened on 1 April 1858. A Wallan Railway Station Post Office opened on 1 October  1873, later renamed as Wallan Wallan East and closing in 1992.

The first and only surviving store was begun by Hugh and Margaret Sinclair about 1860 with their 2-storey residence.  In 1867 Thomas O'Dwyer began a store where the Wallan Hotel now stands.  He converted the store to the Woodmans Arms Hotel in 1883.  George Wallder and John Kyle supplied meat to the township.  The first church erected in Wallan was a wooden building that cost 71 pounds and was opened by the Methodist residents in 1865. Wallan became part of the preaching circuit in 1864 and the following year the modest chapel was built.

In the past, Wallan was a small village with only a few houses and a shop, but today the town boasts multiple estates and developments, the best known is the Hidden Valley Housing Development  to the north. Until 1997 this was a private farm, however it has now been developed as a residential estate with a golf course running through the middle.

The Wellington Square Shopping Centre, opened in 2006, includes many corporate franchise businesses (mainly Victoria's biggest supermarket chain Safeway), creating competition for the already existing Coles Supermarket across the road (which opened 2005, previously operating as Foodworks). As of 2023 the shopping centre includes; Woolworths, Subway, Chemist, Treasure Hunters, Wallan Gift Shop, Charcoal Chicken, two Beauty Salons, Hair Dressers, Cafe, Post Office, and empty shop fronts that are up for lease.

In 2009, Wallan was used as a relief centre for those from surrounding towns affected by the Black Saturday fires.

Education 
Wallan offers both primary and secondary education. Wallan Primary School (est.1857) and Wallan Secondary College (est.2006). Catholic education can be sourced in the nearby town of Kilmore through Saint Patricks Primary and Assumption College Kilmore, and private education through The Kilmore International School (y3-y12) teaching the IB diploma. Childcare and Kindergarten programs in Wallan are offered by multiple private childcare centres and the Mitchell Shire Kindergarten (operating within Wallan Primary School grounds).

Transport 

Wallan station is well connected with the V/Line train network on the Seymour line. Mitchell Shire also operates a town to station connecting bus service for peak hour commuters. 
There is a bus service from Barmah that serves Wallan to Southern Cross station.
At this point the town bus service does not connect all estates to the train station and runs infrequently.

Growth
Wallan has witnessed substantial growth in housing. Traditionally the growth was in the northern side of the town in the Hidden Valley area. Currently, Wallan estates and developments include Greenhills Estate, Featherton Rise, Wallan Valley, Wallara Waters, Newbridge, Hidden Valley, and Springridge, with multiple new developments in planning stages.

Being at the edge of Melbourne's metropolitan boundary, land in Wallan was once fairly cheap, which allowed families to make a living while commuting to the city for work. This has led to large growth in the town as it begins to take the form of an exurb. As the town has grown, land prices have risen to match those of larger suburbs such as Craigieburn and Sunbury, and Wallan is moving away from being considered a country town and is fast becoming a suburb, with discussions around the metropolitan boundary expanded to Kilmore. The railway station and nearby freeway access give commuters quick access to the city. Public Transport Victoria has stated in their Metropolitan Rail Network Development Plan that Wallan should be connected to the electric Metro train network by 2033.

Parks
Wallan has parks in prominent locations, and within estates. It also has a small water park (running mainly in the warmer months) located in the town centre at Hadfield park, this is a large adventure playground with a small splash area and ample picnic spaces including sheltered seating with bbq facilities. There are very limited recreational facilities in the town. Walkways have been improved in recent years with re-vegetation of wetland areas along Watson st and storm water mitigation ponds around Wallara Waters.

See also 
 List of reduplicated Australian place names

References 

Towns in Victoria (Australia)
Shire of Mitchell
Hume Highway